Detmold is a city in North Rhine-Westphalia, Germany, with a population of . It was the capital of the small Principality of Lippe from 1468 until 1918 and then of the Free State of Lippe until 1947. Today it is the administrative center of the district of Lippe and of the Regierungsbezirk Detmold. The Church of Lippe has its central administration located in Detmold. The Reformed Redeemer Church is the preaching venue of the state superintendent of the Lippe church.

History

Iron Age
About  to the southwest of Detmold is the  hill with a prehistoric circular rampart and the Hermann monument. The monument commemorates the so-called Battle of the Teutoburg Forest, a battle in 9 AD which may or may not have been fought close to the present location of Detmold. In this encounter, Germanic tribes led by Hermann defeated Roman legions under the command of Publius Quinctilius Varus.

Middle Ages
Detmold was first mentioned as Theotmalli in 783, the year of a battle between the Saxons and Charlemagne's forces nearby.  This was an event in the Saxon Wars. In 1005 a Tietmelli or Theotmalli region (Gau) is referred to in documents.

In 1263, Bernard III of Lippe fortified the settlement at the crossing of the trade route from Paderborn to Lemgo over the Werre River with stone walls and granted it a municipal charter. Its population was reported in 1305 as 305.  Market rights granted in 1265 led to rapid economic development. Its defenses were greatly strengthened after severe damage had been inflicted on the town during the conflict with Soest in 1447. A major fire in 1547 destroyed more than 70 houses.

In 1550, Detmold became the permanent residence of Count Simon III of Lippe. The counts were elevated to princes in 1789, and Detmold remained the capital of the small Principality of Lippe until the end of the World War I in 1918, when all princely states in Germany were abolished. Today, Stephan, Prince of Lippe is the owner of Detmold Castle.

Modern era
Street lighting was introduced in 1809, with oil-fired lanterns. By 1835, the town had become the most populous in Lippe, with over 4,000 residents. It grew to 12,000 in 1900 and over 30,000 in 1950.

From 1919 to 1947, Detmold was the capital of the Free State of Lippe. When Lippe was incorporated into the new German state of North Rhine-Westphalia, the town became the seat of the Lippe district, and since 1972 it has been the seat of the district administration of Lippe.  With the administrative reform of 1970, 25 nearby villages were incorporated into the city.

The former Hobart Barracks is nearby.

Main sights

  (falconry)
 Donoper Teich (pond)
 Externsteine
 Fürstliches Residenzschloß, a Renaissance castle in the center of the town park
 Hasselbachteich (pond)
 Hermannsdenkmal (Arminius monument)
 Hochschule für Musik Detmold (Music Academy of Detmold)
 OWL University of Applied Sciences and Arts (Technische Hochschule OWL)
Landestheater Detmold, Detmolder Sommertheater
 Lippisches Landesmuseum (museum)
 LWL-Freilichtmuseum Detmold (Detmold open-air museum)
 
 Vogelpark Heiligenkirchen (bird sanctuary)

Culture
The town supports the Nordwestdeutsche Philharmonie for regular symphony concerts.

Schools
 , founded 1602
 Stadtgymnasium Detmold, founded 1830
 Christian-Dietrich-Grabbe-Gymnasium, founded 1925

Twin towns – sister cities

Detmold is twinned with:
Hasselt, Belgium
Saint-Omer, France
Savonlinna, Finland
Zeitz, Germany
Oraiokastro, Greece

Notable people

Notable people born in Detmold include:
 Friedrich Adolph Lampe (1683–1729), theologian
 Simon August, Count of Lippe-Detmold (1727–1782), Count of Lippe
 Leopold I, Prince of Lippe (1767–1802), Prince of Lippe
 Leopold Zunz (1794–1886), scientist, founder of Reform Judaism.
 Leopold II, Prince of Lippe (1796–1851), Prince of Lippe
 Christian Dietrich Grabbe (1801–1836), alongside Georg Büchner the most important innovator of German-language drama in his time.
 Ferdinand Freiligrath (1810–1876), poet and author
 Leopold III, Prince of Lippe (1821–1875), Prince of Lippe
 Ferdinand Weerth (1774–1836), Pastor and School Reformer
 Georg Weerth (1822–1856), writer and poet.
 Gustav Wallis (1830–1878), botanist and South American traveler
  (1879–1966), actor, spieler, elocutionist, singer and regional poet
 Jürgen Stroop (1895–1952), Nazi general of the SS, executed for war crimes
 Werner Buchholz (1922–2019), engineer, creator of the art word byte
 Manfred Fuhrmann (1925–2005), old philologist
 Hans-Ulrich Schmincke (born 1937), volcanologist
 Heinz Burt (1942–2000), British musician and member of The Tornados
 Hartmut Fladt (1945), musicologist
  (born 1946), art historian, for 11 years curator of the German Historical Museum in Berlin
 Iris Berben (born 1950), actress
 Peter Lampe (born 1954), theologian
 Detlef Grumbach (born 1955), journalist, journalist, author and publisher
 Frank-Walter Steinmeier (born 1956), foreign minister, Vice Chancellor, and current President of Germany
 Manfred Ostermann (born 1958), local politician (independent) and former Landrat of Soltau-Fallingbostel
 Andreas Voßkuhle (born 1963), jurist, president of the Bundesverfassungsgericht
 Ludger Beerbaum (born 1963), jumping rider
 Wotan Wilke Möhring (born 1967), actor
 Matthias Opdenhövel (born 1970), television presenter and journalist
 Sven Montgomery (born 1976), Swiss-American cyclist 
 Vera Ludwig (born 1978), poet
 Tujamo (born 1988), DJ and record producer
 Stefan Langemann (born 1990), footballer

Long-time residents of Detmold include: 
 Albert Lortzing (1801–1851), composer.
 Johannes Brahms (1833–1897), composer, lived in Detmold in the winters of 1857–60
 Heinrich Drake (1881–1970), politician
 Felix Fechenbach (1894–1933), journalist
 Florian Reike, entrepreneur
 Giselher Klebe (1925–2009), composer
 Thomas Quasthoff (born 1959), bass-baritone
 Suzanne Bernert, German-born Indian actress

Others:
 Detmold child, a child mummy about 6,500 years old, found in Peru, named after this city.

Amongst the honorary citizens of Detmold, besides politicians are scientists and artists who have served in Detmold. The best-known are the builder of the Hermannsdenkmal, Ernst von Bandel (1871), Reich Chancellor Otto von Bismarck (1895), and Reich President Paul von Hindenburg (1917).

References

External links

  
 
 

 
Lippe
Principality of Lippe
Towns in North Rhine-Westphalia